André Ferreira Teixeira (born 14 August 1993) is a Portuguese professional footballer who plays for Cypriot club AEL Limassol as a right-back.

Club career

Portugal
Born in Porto, Teixeira spent most of his youth in the ranks of hometown club FC Porto. In 2012 he moved to C.F. Os Belenenses, where he made his senior debut on 16 September in a 4–0 home win against F.C. Vizela in the second round of the Taça de Portugal; his Segunda Liga bow followed on 27 October in a 1–1 draw at Leixões SC.

Teixeira spent the first half of 2013–14 loaned to Leixões. On 2 February 2015, having still not made a Primeira Liga appearance for Belenenses, he was loaned back to the second division with C.D. Trofense for the rest of the season.

Teixeira was lent to C.D. Mafra in the 2015–16 campaign, their first since winning promotion as champions of the third tier. He played all but three games as they went straight back down, and scored his first professional goal on 21 November 2015 to equalise the 1–1 home draw with Vitória S.C. B.

For 2016–17, Teixeira returned to Leixões.

Cyprus
In the summer of 2017, Teixeira left Portugal for the first time, to join AEL Limassol of the Cypriot First Division under compatriot manager Bruno Baltazar. The team won the national cup in 2018–19, and he scored in an 8–0 (14–0 aggregate) victory over Enosis Neon THOI Lakatamia in the second round on 30 January 2019.

Honours
AEL
Cypriot Cup: 2018–19

References

External links

1993 births
Living people
Portuguese footballers
Footballers from Porto
Association football defenders
Liga Portugal 2 players
FC Porto players
Padroense F.C. players
C.F. Os Belenenses players
Leixões S.C. players
C.D. Trofense players
C.D. Mafra players
Cypriot First Division players
AEL Limassol players
Portugal youth international footballers
Portuguese expatriate footballers
Expatriate footballers in Cyprus
Portuguese expatriate sportspeople in Cyprus